Oakwood is a neighborhood in northwestern Lexington, Kentucky, United States. Its boundaries are Georgetown Road to the west, Oakwood Park to the east, the Nandino Parkway industrial complex to the south, and the newer Highland Park neighborhood to the north.

Neighborhood statistics
 Area: 
 Population: 328
 Population density: 2,334 people per square mile (901/km2)
 Median household income: $59,111

References

Neighborhoods in Lexington, Kentucky